Grajaú is one of 96 districts in the city of São Paulo, Brazil.

Neighborhoods of Grajaú 

 Catinho do Céu 
 Chácara Cocaia 
 BNH  
 Chácara do Sol 
 Chácara Lagoinha 
 Cidade Luz 
 Cipó do Meio
 Colônia do Grajaú
 Corujas
 Gaivotas 
 Grajaú 
 Ilha do Bororé
 Jardim Almeida Prado 
 Jardim Alvorada (Grajaú) 
 Jardim Arco-íris 
 Jardim Belcito 
 Jardim Bonito 
 Jardim Borba Gato 
 Jardim Brasília 
 Jardim Campinas 
 Jardim Castro Alves 
 Jardim das Pedras (Grajaú)
 Jardim dos Manacás
 Jardim Edda 
 Jardim Edi 
 Jardim Eliana 
 Jardim Ellus
 Jardim Gaivotas 
 Jardim Icaraí 
 Jardim Itajaí 
 Jardim Itatiáia 
 Jardim Jaú
 Jardim Labitary 
 Jardim Lucélia 
 Jardim Marilda
 Jardim Marisa 
 Jardim Mirna 
 Jardim Monte Alegre 
 Jardim Monte Verde
 Jardim Myrna 
 Jardim Noronha 
 Jardim Nossa Senhora Aparecida 
 Jardim Nova Tereza 
 Jardim Novo Horizonte 
 Jardim Novo Jaú 
 Jardim Novo Lar 
 Jardim Orbam 
 Jardim Planalto
 Jardim Porto Velho
 Jardim Prainha
 Jardim Recanto do Sol
 Jardim Reimberg 
 Jardim Sabiá (Grajaú) 
 Jardim Salinas 
 Jardim Samara (Grajaú) 
 Jardim Samas 
 Jardim Santa Bárbara
 Jardim Santa Fé 
 Jardim Santa Francisca
 Jardim Santa Francisca Cabrini
 Jardim Santa Tereza 
 Jardim São Bernardo 
 Jardim São Pedro (Grajaú) 
 Jardim São Remo 
 Jardim Sete de Setembro
 Jardim Shangri-lá 
 Jardim Sipramar 
 Jardim Tanay 
 Jardim Três Corações 
 Jardim Varginha 
 Jardim Orion 
 Jardim Zilda
 Lago Azul 
 Parada 57 
 Parque América (Grajaú) 
 Parque Brasil 
 Parque Cocaia 
 Parque Deizy
 Parque Grajaú 
 Parque Manacá 
 Parque Novo Grajaú 
 Parque Planalto 
 Parelheiros (Grajaú)
 Parque Santa Cecília
 Parque São José
 Parque São Miguel 
 Parque São Paulo 
 Parque Shangrilá 
 Recanto Marisa 
 Sítio Cocaia
 Toca do Tatu 
 Vila Morais Prado 
 Vila Narciso 
 Vila Nascente 
 Vila Natal

See also
 Grajaú (CPTM) Train Station
 Mendes-Vila Natal (CPTM) Train Station
 Line 9 (CPTM)
 Roman Catholic Diocese of Santo Amaro

References

External links
 Grajaú News 
 News from the Region
 Roman Catholic Diocese of Santo Amaro

Districts of São Paulo